Cabaret (German: Kabarett or Dieses Lied bleibt bei Dir) is a 1954 West German drama film directed by Willi Forst and starring Paul Henreid, Eva Kerbler and Fritz Schulz. It was shot at the Bavaria Studios in Munich. The film's sets were designed by the art director Willy Schatz and Werner Schlichting.

Cast
 Paul Henreid as Konrad Hegner
 Eva Kerbler as 	Leonie
 Fritz Schulz as 	Conferencier
 Dorit Kreysler as 	Franzi Holm
 Elma Karlowa as 	Trixie
 Ernst Stankovski as 	Karl Haller
 Nicole Heesters as 	Valerie
 Paula Braend as 	Die junge Isolde
 Gretl Fröhlich as Die alte Isolde
 Edith Schollwer as 	Baronin Solms
 Melanie Horeschowsky as 	Frau Hugl
 Friedrich Domin as 	Paul Lincke
 Leopold Hainisch as Leopold Holzinger
 Charles Regnier as	Musik-Kritiker

References

Bibliography 
 Bock, Hans-Michael and Bergfelder, Tim. The Concise Cinegraph: An Encyclopedia of German Cinema. Berghahn Books, 2009.

External links 
 

1954 films
West German films
German drama films
1954 drama films
1950s German-language films
Films directed by Willi Forst
Films shot at Bavaria Studios
1950s German films